James Wilson Henty (17 July 1909 – 26 January 1995) was an Australian politician.

He was born in Launceston. In 1968 he was elected to the Tasmanian House of Assembly as a Liberal member for Bass in a recount following the death of John Steer. Re-elected at the 1969 election, he was defeated in 1972.

It is unclear whether or not he was descended from the pioneering Henty family.

References

1909 births
1995 deaths
Liberal Party of Australia members of the Parliament of Tasmania
Members of the Tasmanian House of Assembly
20th-century Australian politicians
Politicians from Launceston, Tasmania